Gimme Shelter is a 2013 American independent Christian drama film written and directed by Ronald Krauss and starring Vanessa Hudgens, James Earl Jones, Rosario Dawson, Stéphanie Szostak, Emily Meade, Ann Dowd, and Brendan Fraser. It is based on a true story about a runaway teenage girl who becomes pregnant and is placed in a home for pregnant girls.

Plot
Agnes "Apple" Bailey (Vanessa Hudgens) has never had an easy life. She has been in and out of foster care for years, and her mother, June, is an abusive drug addict who only wants her for the welfare money she provides. She decides to run away and go in search of her absent father Tom Fitzpatrick (Brendan Fraser) who she discovers is now a wealthy Wall Street broker with a family. Tom agrees to take her in, but she is quickly forced out again when he and his wife learn she is pregnant, and do not agree with her decision to keep the baby.

When a pimp forces her into his vehicle to discuss "business", thinking that she is someone else, Apple jumps into the driver's seat, speeds away and crashes the car. Apple awakes in a hospital where a priest, Father Frank McCarthy, is waiting to speak with her. After gaining her trust, Father McCarthy arranges for her to stay in a home for pregnant teenage girls. The shelter is run by a formerly homeless woman, Kathy. June is informed that Apple will be staying there, and she goes to the shelter in an attempt to take her to her home, but is forced to leave after she gets violent.

Apple bonds with the other girls at the shelter, beginning to open up and trust them. She gives birth to a baby girl and names her Hope. Tom comes to visit and the two reconcile. He offers to let Apple and Hope come live with him, but as they are leaving, Apple realizes she has already made a home for herself at the shelter and decides to stay.

Cast
 Vanessa Hudgens as Agnes "Apple" Bailey
 James Earl Jones as Father McCarthy
 Rosario Dawson as June Bailey
 Stéphanie Szostak as Joanna Fitzpatrick
 Emily Meade as Cassandra
 Ann Dowd as Kathy
 Brendan Fraser as Tom Fitzpatrick
 Dascha Polanco as Carmel
 Candace Smith as Marie Abeanni
 Tashiana R. Washington as Destiny / Princess
 Rachel Mattila as Nicky Lotito
 Natalie Guerrero as Tina
 Laneya Wiles as Jasmine
 Kemani Holmes as Hope
 Jade Jackson as Tawana
 Gena Bardwell as Afra

Production
The film was filmed in New York, and New Jersey. Filming started June 9, 2011.
 
Before the film, director Ronald Krauss had spent a year documenting the stories of girls who were coming in the Several Sources Shelter founded by Kathy DiFlore, and grew to know DiFiore, the shelter, and the two girls Apple Bailey is based on. The film was shot in the home of Kathy DiFiore and the original Several Sources Shelter.
 
Vanessa Hudgens, in explaining why the story of Apple appealed to her, said, "... it’s very relevant to what’s going on around us and I think that it’s easy to block it out because it’s uncomfortable. It’s something that we don’t want to discuss, but the fact is it’s happening all around us. Young people are becoming homeless and don’t have anywhere to go. Young mothers who have no support and no love and no place to call their own… just so much. I mean, abuse and homelessness, it’s all happening around us way more than we are allowing ourselves to see."

Discussing why her role as Apple's drug-addicted mother June had special meaning for her, Rosario Dawson said, "My mom had me when she was 17. I grew up in a squat in the Lower East Side, and the dropout rate and teen pregnancy rate in my hood was very high. Luckily, my mom had some support and was a good role model. She told me I could be anything I wanted to be. But not everybody gets a happy ending. Some people make some bad choices, and they never, ever recover from them.” 

Brendan Fraser and James Earl Jones donated their salaries to the real-life shelters (Several Sources Shelters) portrayed in the film.

Reception
Gimme Shelter received generally unfavorable reviews from film critics. The website's critical consensus reads, "In spite of its obvious good intentions — and the compelling true story that inspired it — the heavy-handed Gimme Shelter can't overcome its cliche-riddled script." The aggregator Metacritic gave the film a weighted average score of 37/100 based on 29 critics, indicating "generally unfavorable reviews".
 
On RogerEbert.com, critic Sheila O'Malley rated the film 2-1/2 stars out of 4, saying the "scenes between Dawson and Hudgens vibrate with pain and ugliness. The script is often obvious, with all feelings laid out too cleanly, but both actresses still manage to create a jagged relationship based on their characters' codependence and shared traumas. One of the film's strengths is its portrayal of the 'system' and what it does to abused children, and the layers of bureaucracy that make it hard to bring about meaningful change in people's lives." Michael O'Sullivan of The Washington Post praised Hudgens for showing "great conviction" in her role's physical transformation to capture the "character's vulnerability" and Dowd for giving an "unvarnished performance" as Kathy DiFiore, but felt that Krauss' scripting "attempts at wringing drama out of real life are more strenuous than is strictly necessary", concluding that: "It's not the only time "Gimme Shelter" doesn't trust the power of its own story — and the truth of its acting — to deliver the point." Betsy Sharkey of the Los Angeles Times criticized Krauss for writing a predictable plot with "hackneyed moments" and "many missed opportunities to bring some real meaning" to the movie, but gave praise to Hudgens for making a "surprisingly affecting turn" in her role, saying, "[T]here are moments of vulnerability and indecision in her performance that begin to illuminate the serious issues facing kids in such straits. Those moments are fleeting. What sticks in the sense that the actress is on her way to making a mark." Rolling Stones Peter Travers commended Hudgens' performance for being "a decent try at authenticity", but criticized Krauss for crafting the film around her by using cornball clichés with "a broad Hollywood brush", concluding that "Gimme Shelter appears hijacked by the Christian right. Propaganda is a bitch to act. And this misguided movie leaves Hudgens buried in it."

References

External links
 
 
 
 
 Gimme Shelter soundtrack
 Several Sources Shelters website

2013 films
2013 directorial debut films
2013 drama films
2013 independent films
2010s American films
2010s coming-of-age drama films
2010s English-language films
American coming-of-age drama films
American independent films
American pregnancy films
Coming-of-age films based on actual events
Drama films based on actual events
Films about domestic violence
Films scored by Ólafur Arnalds
Films shot in Connecticut
Films shot in New Jersey
Films shot in Newark, New Jersey
Films shot in New York (state)
Roadside Attractions films
Teenage pregnancy in film